Julen Azkue Unzueta (born 21 September 1995) is a Spanish footballer who plays for Atlético Sanluqueño as a midfielder.

Club career
Born in Zarautz, Gipuzkoa, Basque Country, Azkue finished his formation with SD Eibar. On 8 August 2014, he was loaned to Tercera División side CD Lagun Onak for one year.

Upon returning, Azkue was assigned to the reserves also in the fourth division.

Azkue made his first team debut on 28 November 2017, coming on as a second-half substitute for Joan Jordán in a 0–1 away loss against Celta de Vigo, for the season's Copa del Rey. The following 19 June, he signed for Arenas Club de Getxo in the third division.

References

External links
 
 

1994 births
living people
people from Zarautz
Footballers from the Basque Country (autonomous community)
Spanish footballers
association football midfielders
Segunda División B players
Tercera División players
CD Vitoria footballers
SD Eibar footballers
Arenas Club de Getxo footballers
CD Tudelano footballers
SD Amorebieta footballers
CF Villanovense players
Atlético Sanluqueño CF players